Love Is (Thai:เลิฟอีส), also stylized as LOVEiS, is a record label founded in 2004 by Boyd Kosiyabong and Kamol Sukosol Clapp, co-founders of Bakery Music (now a division of Sony Music Entertainment).

Artists
 Boyd Kosiyabong
 Room 39
 Meme Nopparat
 Pru
 Kamol Sukosol Clapp
 7th Scene
 Stamp Apiwat
 Friday
 Zentrady
 Two Popetorn
 TOR+
 Sweat16!
 SBFIVE
 Now United

See also
 List of record labels
 Bakery Music

External links
  
 

Thai record labels
Record labels established in 2004
2004 establishments in Thailand